Sasser may refer to:

Sasser (grape), a Romanian/Moldovan wine grape variety that is also known as Băbească neagră
Sasser Pass (also Saser Pass, Saser-la), on the old caravan route between Ladakh and Yarkand
Sasser (computer worm)
Sasser, Georgia
Sasser Cup

People with the surname
Bud Sasser, professional football player
Buddy Sasser, former football coach and Big South Conference commissioner
Clarence Sasser, a Vietnam veteran who received the Medal of Honor in 1969
Grant Sasser, former NHL player
Howell Sasser, Episcopalian priest
Jason Sasser, former professional basketball player
Jeryl Sasser, former professional basketball player in Kuwait
Jim Sasser, a Democrat who represented Tennessee in the senate from 1977 to 1995
Mackey Sasser, a former MLB player who was active from 1987 to 1995
Marcus Sasser, basketball player for the Houston Cougars
Mattie Sasser, a Marshallese weightlifter who represented Marshall Islands at the 2016 Summer Olympics
Rob Sasser, former MLB player
Sean Sasser, a pastry chef and television personality best known for The Real World: San Francisco
Wayne Sasser, Republican member of the North Carolina House of Representatives elected in 2018